Eroni Clarke (born 31 March 1969) is a former New Zealand rugby union player who played for Auckland, the Blues, the Highlanders and the All Blacks at international level. Clarke made 155 appearances for Auckland, making him the fifth (equal with Sean Fitzpatrick) most capped player in the union's history. He also scored 73 tries for Auckland, the fourth most in the union's history. Clarke also made 48 appearances for the Auckland Blues at Super 12 level and made fourteen total appearances (ten test matches) for New Zealand, making his international debut in 1992.

In August 2020 Clarke was appointed New Zealand Rugby's first Pasifika Engagement Manager.

Eroni Clarke's sister is former Silver Fern Sheryl Clarke. He became the 21st former All Black whose son also represented the team, when his son, Blues winger Caleb Clarke debuted for New Zealand in 2020 in Wellington.

In 2020, Eroni was in Match Fit to trim down and prepare for a one-match comeback with fellow ex-All Blacks against recently retired but far more in-shape Barbarians in 8 weeks. He was granted leave on Day 1 after biometric tests, as the day coincided with Caleb Clarke being selected for the All Blacks, and also missed the final Bronco test as it was the week when Caleb made his debut in Wellington. He played in the full-contact match against Pukekohe Presidents as a lock. In 2021/22, he returned for season 2, where he returned to increase his cardio fitness to prepare for the 90's and 2000's Classic Wallabies, whereby the team mostly consisted of players that dominated the Tri Nations against All Blacks and South Africa in that era and won consecutive Bledisloe Cups. He sat out of the first tackle rugby game against East Coast due to impinged nerve in his neck.

References

External links

Living people
New Zealand international rugby union players
New Zealand rugby union players
Blues (Super Rugby) players
Highlanders (rugby union) players
Auckland rugby union players
Black Rams Tokyo players
1969 births
New Zealand sportspeople of Samoan descent
Expatriate rugby union players in Japan
Sportspeople from Apia
People educated at Henderson High School, Auckland
Rugby union centres